Lecanvey or Leckanvy is a seaside village in County Mayo, Ireland, between Westport and Louisburgh, about 2 km west of Murrisk. It has a small beach with Lecanvey Pier. To the south is Croagh Patrick. To the west is Clare Island.

The Lecanvey Community Alliance was constituted in 2006, with the intent to improve the environment of the parts of the area which do not fall into the catchment area of Murrisk or of Louisburgh.

Transport

Road
Lecanvey is located on the R335 regional road.

Bus Éireann local route 450 Louisburgh-Lecanvey-Murrisk-Westport provides two to three journeys in each direction daily except Sundays. On Thursdays the route extends west to Killadoon.

Rail access
The nearest rail services may be accessed at Westport railway station, which is located approximately 15 km from the settlement.

Townlands served by the Lecanvey Community Alliance

Notable residents
The Iranian-American author Marsha Mehran rented a house in Lecanvey, where she died in April 2014.

See also
List of towns and villages in Ireland

References

Towns and villages in County Mayo